Since the first Europeans visited the west coast of Australia in the 17th century, Rottnest Island has seen numerous shipwrecks.

Following is a list of the twelve larger and surveyed shipwrecks close by to Rottnest Island. The list is in chronological order. Details on every shipwreck at the island are unknown as many thousands of vessels of varying size visit the island each year. Other ships have been lost (or in the case of the Rottnest ship graveyard, deliberately scuttled) in waters further off-shore, including some closer to Fremantle. Still others were stranded on rocks at Rottnest but were refloated. Anitra II, for example is in this latter category, but is included in the list as the hull was on display on the island near the main settlement. It was lost at night during the 1979 Parmelia Race only a few nautical miles from the finish line.

Plaques have been located next to the wrecks as well as onshore to indicate their locations as part of a "wreck trail" concept produced by the Western Australian Museum in association with the Rottnest Island Authority. In encouraging full access to all the sites, by marking them on navigation charts and by producing interpretive materials in exhibitions, pamphlets and on the plaques, the wrecks have become part of a "museum-without-walls" concept. All of the wrecks are protected under Commonwealth legislation in the Historic Shipwrecks Act 1976 and State legislation in the Maritime Archaeology Act (1973). The Rottnest Island Wreck Trail was the first in the Southern Hemisphere and the first of Western Australia's heritage trails. The concept has been widely copied since.

Lighthouses
The first stone lighthouse built in Western Australia was completed in 1849 and built in the centre of the island. The  tower was replaced in 1896 with a new tower, the current Wadjemup Lighthouse.

Following an inquiry after the City of York disaster in 1899, the Bathurst Lighthouse was built at Bathurst Point on the north-eastern end of the island.

Map

List

See also
 Shipwrecks of Western Australia

Notes

References

External links

 Rottnest Island Authority
 Map
 Wreckfinder database of Western Australian Museum

Shipwrecks of Western Australia
Rottnest Island